The Stenotype Institute was an ACICS accredited private stenography school with two campuses, one in Jacksonville, Florida, and one in Orlando, Florida.

It was one of the only 64 schools in North America certified by the NCRA.
  
Both campuses offered day and evening classes and started new classes every two months. They taught the Phoenix Theory method of machine shorthand.

Jacksonville Campus 
The school was founded in Jacksonville in 1940 by Thyra Ellis. The Jacksonville office was run by Gloria Wiley who put it out of business.

It was located three miles (5 km) east of Downtown Jacksonville in a  building, complete with a student lounge/auditorium, 15 classrooms, a computer lab, and a library.  The school was closed in March 2015 after it was found that the owners were involved in financial aid fraud.

Orlando Campus 
Because of the continued success of the Jacksonville campus, Stenotype Institute opened a campus nearby Downtown Orlando in 2002.

The school occupied a  building which included a student lounge, 12 classrooms, a library, an auditorium, two computer labs and a gym with lockers.

The school closed on September 30, 2013.

External links
 Stenotype Institute's website

Notes and references

Court reporting
Education in Florida
Transcription (linguistics)
1940 establishments in Florida
Educational institutions established in 1940
2016 disestablishments in Florida
Educational institutions disestablished in 2016